Delusions of Grandeur is a 1971 French comedy film directed by Gérard Oury. It is a comedic adaptation of the play Ruy Blas by Victor Hugo.

Plot
In the 17th century Spanish Empire, Don Salluste (Louis de Funès) works as a dishonest and greedy finance minister who is strongly disliked by the peasants. After being fired by the Queen (Karin Schubert) over allegations he illegitimately fathered a child with a royal handmaid, Salluste plots to get his revenge by compromising the Queen by getting a nobleman to seduce her, which would anger the King (Alberto de Mendoza). When Don César (Gabriele Tinti), Salluste's noble relative, declines to help him, Salluste hires his valet, Blaze (Yves Montand), who he introduces as Don César; he sells the real César into slavery in the Barbary Coast. Though the Queen is willing to enter a relationship with "César", Salluste's plans are unintentionally obstructed by Dona Juana (Alice Sapritch), an old duanna who is infatuated with Blaze, much to his chagrin.

Blaze takes Salluste's former position as finance minister. However, unlike Salluste, Blaze is generous and institutes many reforms: he gives almost all of Salluste's riches to the peasants, and heavily taxes the rich instead of the poor. This makes Blaze the target of ire among the nobles, who attempt to assassinate him. Salluste learns of a plot to poison Blaze's cake at his birthday celebration in a villa and warns Blaze; the two fight their way out, evading their pursuers by trapping them in a bullfighting ring. However, upon escaping, Salluste captures Blaze. Meanwhile, in the Barbary Coast, the real César is working as a slave for a Bedouin chief, pushing a wheel alongside other slaves to water the chief's potted plant. Using the Bedouins' prayers as a distraction, César escapes and travels back to Spain, where he watches Salluste take Blaze captive.

After using an uncooperative parrot to relay an invitation to the Queen (and also unintentionally Dona Juana), Salluste imprisons Blaze in his villa, where he explains his new plan: he will bring the Queen to the room, knock both of them out, leave them in bed together, and call the King to investigate. César locates the villa and confronts Blaze, and the two work together to thwart Salluste. Dona Juana arrives and attempts to seduce Blaze, but she drinks a laced cup of wine and falls unconscious. When the Queen arrives, Salluste knocks her out with chloroform. After encountering several issues involving the occupants of the bed, Salluste manages to get Blaze and the Queen in bed together.

The King and his guards arrive, having been called over by Salluste earlier. However, when Salluste leads the King into the bedroom, he is shocked to find that Blaze is in bed with Dona Juana; Blaze secretly helped César escape with the Queen, and the two of them fall in love.

The King, angered at Salluste, orders his guards to capture him. However, he offers Blaze a choice: marry Dona Juana and remain free, or join Salluste in captivity. Blaze chooses the latter, and the two are sentenced to slavery in the Barbary Coast, under the same Bedouin chief from before. Though Salluste and Blaze are apparently content with their life as slaves, Blaze sees Dona Juana in the distance and realizes she has followed him to the Barbary Coast. The film ends with everyone laughing as Blaze flees into the desert, Dona Juana chasing after him.

Cast 

 Louis de Funès - Don Salluste de Bazan
 Yves Montand - Blaze
 Alice Sapritch - Dona Juana - la duègne
 Karin Schubert - La Reine / The Queen
 Alberto de Mendoza - Le Roi / The King
 Jaime de Mora y Aragón - Un Grand d'Espagne
 Eduardo Fajardo - Un Grand d'Espagne
 Antonio Pica - Un Grand d'Espagne
 Joaquín Solís - Un Grand d'Espagne 
 Venantino Venantini - Del Basto
 Gabriele Tinti - Don Cesar
 Paul Préboist - The mute
 Sal Borgese - Le borgne

Release
The English version of the film was released by Synkronized USA.

References

External links 
 
 

1971 films
Films directed by Gérard Oury
Films shot in Barcelona
Films shot in Madrid
Films set in Spain
1970s French-language films
Films based on works by Victor Hugo
Films set in the 1690s
Films shot in Almería
1970s historical comedy films
French historical comedy films
1970s French films